Wilhelmus Zakaria Johannes (1895 – September 4, 1952) was an Indonesian radiology medical doctor. Johannes was the first Indonesian medical doctor who learned radiology in the CBZ (Civil Hospital) in Batavia and then became an expert in Rontgen technology and had contributed a lot to the development of medical studies in Indonesia.  The Indonesian government honored WZ Johannes as a National Hero of Indonesia and named a general hospital in Kupang, East Nusa Tenggara after him. As a tribute, the name Wilhelmus Zakaria Johannes was used on an Indonesian Navy ship, the KRI Wilhelmus Zakarias Yohannes.  Johannes died in 1952 and was buried at the Jati Petamburan Cemetery in Central Jakarta.

WZ Johannes was the cousin of Professor Herman Johannes, an Indonesian professor who was the Rector of Gadjah Mada University and uncle of Helmi Johannes, a newscaster and executive producer for VOA Indonesian television in Washington DC.

References

Indonesian Christians
Indonesian radiologists
National Heroes of Indonesia
1895 births
1952 deaths
Indonesian expatriates in the Netherlands
People from East Nusa Tenggara